Hartford is a civil parish in Cheshire West and Chester, England. It contains 14 buildings that are recorded in the National Heritage List for England as designated listed buildings. The parish is almost entirely residential and rural. The West Coast Main Line and the Chester to Manchester railway lines run through it, as do the River Weaver and the Weaver Navigation, and the A556 and the A559 roads. The listed buildings include houses and associated structures, a farmhouse and farm buildings, a hotel, a railway viaduct and a tunnel under a railway, a milepost, a church, and a war memorial.

Key

Listed buildings

See also
Listed buildings in Cuddington
Listed buildings in Davenham

Listed buildings in Northwich
Listed buildings in Weaverham
Listed buildings in Whitegate and Marton

References
Citations

Sources

Listed buildings in Cheshire West and Chester
Lists of listed buildings in Cheshire